Oliver Carter may refer to:
 Oli Carter, English cricketer
 Oliver Jesse Carter, American judge
 Oliver Carter (priest), Church of England clergyman and divine
 Oliver Carter (wrestler), Swiss professional wrestler
 Ollie Carter, a character from the soap opera EastEnders